The 2019 Boels Rental Ladies Tour also known as the 2019 Holland Ladies Tour is the 22nd edition of the Holland Ladies Tour, a women's cycle stage race held in the Netherlands. The tour was part of the 2019 women's road cycling calendar and was part of the UCI Women's World Tour. It ran from 3 to 8 September 2019.

Stages

Teams
Sixteen professional women's teams and one national team entered the race.

National teams: 
 Netherlands

Classification leadership

See also

 2019 in women's road cycling

References

External links
 

UCI Women's World Tour races
Boels Rental Ladies Tour
Boels Rental Ladies Tour
Boels Rental Ladies Tour
Holland Ladies Tour
Cycling in Arnhem
Cycling in Gennep
Cycling in Hellendoorn
Cycling in Nijmegen
Cycling in Sittard-Geleen
Cycling in Weert